Amy is a 1984 British television drama film directed by Nat Crosby and starring Harriet Walter, Clive Francis and George A. Cooper. It portrays the life of the pioneering British pilot Amy Johnson in the years leading up to her disappearance in 1941.

Main cast
 Harriet Walter as Amy Johnson
 Clive Francis as Jim Mollison
 George A. Cooper as Will Johnson
 Stephanie Cole as Cis Johnson
 Robert Pugh as Jack Humphreys
 Patrick Troughton as Lord Rothermere
 John Grillo as Bell
 Roger Hammond as Sir Sefton Brancker
 Denys Hawthorne as Col. Francis Shelmerdine
 Richard Durden as Captain Bill Hope
 Douglas Reith as Jimmy Martin

References

Bibliography
 Crosby, Nat. A Cameraman Abroad: From "Panorama" to Paranoia. Larks Press, 2002.

External links
 

1984 television films
1984 films
Films set in the 1930s
Films set in the 1940s
BBC television dramas
1980s English-language films
1980s British films
British drama television films